Corneliu Stroe (22 October 1949 – 11 June 2017) was a Romanian drummer and percussionist.

Born in Bucharest, he moved at the age of 2 to Mediaș, due to his father's job. He grew up there, and later became a member of several local bands, among them Orfeus.

Creative
Between 1981 and 2005 he was a member of Creative, together with Harry Tavitian, with whom he participated in many Romanian jazz festivals, in Sibiu, Galați, Ploiești, etc.

Other collaborations 
 Gheorghe Zamfir
 Ovidiu Lipan
 Jazzographics
 Blues Community 
 Aromanian Ethno Band; participated in the FMM Sines - Festival Músicas do Mundo, Portugal
 Mike Godoroja & Blue Spirit
 Zig Rag Orchestra of Étienne Brunet
 Corneliu Stroe Balkan Blues Band
 Balkanamera
 Vasile Șeicaru
 Foxy Lady Band
 Direcția 5
 Pasărea Colibri
 Nightlosers
 Mircea Baniciu
 Johnny Răducanu
 Alexandru Andrieș
 A. G. Weinberger

His daughter, is arguably the only female blues guitarist in România.

Awards 
 First Prize at the Student Art Festival ("Marele Premiu al Artei Studențești", 1974)

Discography 
 Horizons, Leo Records, Londra, 1985 (with Harry Tavitian)
 Transylvanian Suite, Leo Records, Londra, 1986 (with Harry Tavitian)
 Post Communism Atmosphere, Deux ZZ Records, Paris,1984 (with Etienne Brunet)
 Creațiunea, București, 1991 (with Harry Tavitian)
 Roots (with Blues Community) (cassette)
 Visul toboșarului (with Ovidiu Lipan, etc.)

References 

1949 births
2017 deaths
Musicians from Bucharest
People from Mediaș
Romanian drummers
Romanian percussionists
Romanian jazz musicians